The 1951–52 NBA season was the Hawks' third season in the NBA and first season in Milwaukee.

Offseason

Draft picks

Roster

Regular season

Season standings

x – clinched playoff spot

Record vs. opponents

Game log

Player statistics

Season

Awards and records

Transactions

References

See also
 1951–52 NBA season

Atlanta Hawks seasons
Mil
Milwaukee Hawks
Milwaukee Hawks